Gymnotocinclus anosteos is a species of armored catfish (Loricariidae) endemic to Brazil, where it is found in the Tocantinzinho River in the Tocantins River basin. This species grows to a length of  SL.

The genus Gymnotocinclus is unusual among the Loricariidae due to its extremely reduced armor plates that are characteristic of the family, giving the fish a relatively naked body. This fish probably has a basal position in the subfamily Hypoptopomatinae.

References

Loricariidae
Taxa named by Tiago Pinto Carvalho
Taxa named by Pablo Cesar Lehmann-Albornoz
Taxa named by Roberto Esser dos Reis
Catfish of South America
Fish of Brazil
Endemic fauna of Brazil
Fish described in 2008